Queens Council may be:

Queen's Counsel - are jurists appointed by letters patent to be one of Her Majesty's Counsel learned in the law
Queens Borough Council
The Times cartoon satire Queens Counsel